The 1952 Chicago White Sox season was the team's 52nd season in the major leagues, and its 53rd season overall. They finished with a record of 81–73, good enough for third place in the American League, 14 games behind the 1st place New York Yankees.

Offseason 
 October 10, 1951: Marv Rotblatt, Jerry Dahlke, Bill Fischer, and Dick Duffy (minors) were traded by the White Sox to the Seattle Rainiers for Marv Grissom and Hal Brown.
 November 27, 1951: Joe DeMaestri, Gordon Goldsberry, Dick Littlefield, Gus Niarhos, and Jim Rivera were traded by the White Sox to the St. Louis Browns for Al Widmar, Sherm Lollar, and Tom Upton.

Regular season

Season standings

Record vs. opponents

Opening Day lineup 
 Chico Carrasquel, SS
 Nellie Fox, 2B
 Minnie Miñoso, LF
 Eddie Robinson, 1B
 Ray Coleman, RF
 Sherm Lollar, C
 Jim Busby, CF
 Héctor Rodríguez, 3B
 Billy Pierce, P

Notable transactions 
 July 28, 1952: Jay Porter and Ray Coleman were traded by the White Sox to the St. Louis Browns for Darrell Johnson and Jim Rivera.

Roster

Player stats

Batting 
Note: G = Games played; AB = At bats; R = Runs scored; H = Hits; 2B = Doubles; 3B = Triples; HR = Home runs; RBI = Runs batted in; BB = Base on balls; SO = Strikeouts; AVG = Batting average; SB = Stolen bases

Pitching 
Note: W = Wins; L = Losses; ERA = Earned run average; G = Games pitched; GS = Games started; SV = Saves; IP = Innings pitched; H = Hits allowed; R = Runs allowed; ER = Earned runs allowed; HR = Home runs allowed; BB = Walks allowed; K = Strikeouts

Farm system 

LEAGUE CHAMPIONS: Memphis, Superior, Madisonville

Notes

References 
 1952 Chicago White Sox at Baseball Reference

Chicago White Sox seasons
Chicago White Sox season
Chicago White